Marcelo Luiz Rezende Fernandes (November 12, 1951 – September 16, 2017) was a Brazilian journalist and television presenter.

He began his career as a sports journalist in the city of Rio de Janeiro in the coverage of several major games in the 1970s.

Biography  
Rezende worked at Rede Globo for 23 years as a reporter, where he was hired to present the Linha Direta police program until December 2000. He was last seen on RecordTV, where he presented the Cidade Alerta program. In May 2017 Rezende was diagnosed with pancreatic and liver cancer, and eventually died on September 16, 2017 at 17:45 BRT, after suffering from multiple organ failure.

References 

1951 births
2017 deaths
Brazilian television presenters
Brazilian television journalists
People from Rio de Janeiro (city)
Deaths from pancreatic cancer
Deaths from liver cancer
Deaths from cancer in São Paulo (state)